St. Stephen's Basilica is a Roman Catholic basilica in Budapest, Hungary. It is named in honour of Stephen, the first King of Hungary (c 975–1038), whose right hand is housed in the reliquary. It was the sixth largest church building in Hungary before 1920. Since the renaming of the primatial see, it has been the co-cathedral of the Roman Catholic Archdiocese of Esztergom-Budapest. Today, it is the third largest church building in present-day Hungary.

Architecture 
The site of today's basilica was a theater in the 18th century. This theater, named Hetz-Theater, was a place where animal fights were hosted. One of the wealthy citizens (János Zitterbarth) of the newly formed district built a temporary church there. In the late 1810s, about a thousand people formed the Lipótváros Parish. Then they began the fundraising and the believers started to make plans for the future church.

The church is named after Saint Stephen I of Hungary, the first King of Hungary (c. 975–1038), whose incorruptible right hand is housed in the reliquary.

This is the most important church building in Hungary, one of the most significant tourist attractions and the third highest church in Hungary.

Equal with the Hungarian Parliament Building, it is one of the two tallest buildings in  Budapest at  - this equation symbolises that worldly and spiritual thinking have the same importance. It was completed in 1905 after 54 years of construction, according to the plans of Miklós Ybl, and was completed by József Kauser. Much of this delay can be attributed to the collapse of the dome in 1868 which required complete demolition of the completed works and rebuilding from the ground up.

The architectural style is Neo-Classical; it has a Greek cross ground plan. The façade is anchored by two large bell towers. Its predecessor had a weight of almost , but it was used for military purposes during World War II. Visitors may access the dome by elevators or by climbing 364 stairs for a 360° view overlooking Budapest.

At first, the building was supposed to be named after Saint Leopold, the patron saint of Austria, but the plan was changed in the last minute, so it became St. Stephen's Basilica.

The Basilica is rich in fine arts.   In the lobby of the main entrance you can see the Saint Stephen's relief of Károly Senyei, and mosaics by Bertalan Székely and Mór Than. The dome above the sanctuary shows the representation of the Lord God, and the tambourine shows Christ as well as the prophets and evangelists (built by Károly Lotz). The sanctuary vault features allegories of the Holy Mass on mosaics by Gyula Benczúr and highlights the important stages of St. Stephen's life in the bronze relief series by Ede Mayer. The canopy altarpiece designed by József Kauser is decorated with the statue of St. Stephen by Alajos Stróbl.

The pulpit is also work of József Kauser. The glass painting works were made by Miksa Róth, and the pipe organ of the church is the product of the factory of Pécs and József Angster recognized in the era. He carried out the painting and, in particular, the gilding of the interior decoration.

Other works of art inside the basilica (builders in parenthesis):

Concerts in the Basilica
The Saint Stephen Basilica has played an active role in the musical community since its consecration in 1905. The head organists of the church have always been very highly regarded musicians. In the past century the Basilica has been home to choral music, classical music as well as contemporary musical performances. The Basilica choir performs often in different parts of Europe as well as at home. In the summer months they perform every Sunday. During these months you can see performances from many distinguished Hungarian and foreign organ players alike.

As an example of the quality of musicians that perform these concerts, the following information is taken from a 2012 advertisement: One of the most famous Hungarian organists is Miklós Teleki;
along with András Virágh, he is among some of the best organ players in Hungary. The concerts include arias, which are sung by Kolos Kováts, one of the most famous concert and oratorio singers in Hungary; among numerous prizes, in 1992 he received also the highest prize Hungarian artists can acquire: the Kossuth Prize. The flute is played by Eleonóra Krusic, who is already known for her performances with different orchestras, from Barcelona to Zürich, Granz and Viena. These concerts take place on Thursday evenings and last  a little over an hour. There are other performances available, such as the 15 minute "mini concerts" on Fridays, performed by András Virágh.

Bells of the basilica 
The two towers have six bells altogether: five small bells in the north tower and a single bourdon in the south tower.  The bourdon called the Great St. Stephan bell is the biggest bell in Hungary with its 9250 kilograms and its diameter of 252 centimeters. Usually it is used twice a year, at 5pm on August 20, which is the date it was consecrated while the four smaller bells were consecrated three years later on the same day. It also tolls at midnight on New Year's Eve and some special events when it tolls like the death of a Prime Minister or tragic events like the 9/11, but it is quite rare. The four smallest bells are founded in Passau in 1993.  

Great St. Stephan bell:

The largest bell in the church and in Hungary. Located in the south tower, it weighs 9250 kg and has a diameter of 240 cm. It was made by the Perner bell foundry in Passau, Germany in 1990, this bell chimes the hour.

Blessed Virgin Mary bell:

The 2nd largest and oldest bell in the church, founded by Ferenc Walser in 1863 in Pest. It weighs 3100 kg and has a diameter of 178,5 cm, this bell chimes the quarter hours and has a unique looking clapper. 

St. Henry II. bell:

It weighs 2150 kg and has a diameter of 150 cm. 

Blessed Gizella bell:

It weighs 1250 kg and has a diameter of 117,8 cm.

Saint Emeric bell:

The 2nd smallest bell in the church, weighing 750 kg. 

Saint Erzsébet (Elizabeth) from the House of Árpád bell:
The smallest bell in the church, weighing 500 kg.

Gallery

See also 
 Pest
 Roman Catholicism in Hungary
 List of cathedrals in Hungary
 List of tallest domes

References

External links 

 Official website of Saint Stephen's Basilica in Hungarian
 Choir of the Saint Stephen Basilica
 Interior view of Saint Stephen's Basilica
 Organ concert tickets online reservation

Roman Catholic churches in Budapest
Roman Catholic cathedrals in Hungary
Basilica churches in Hungary
Roman Catholic churches completed in 1905
Catholic Church in Hungary
Church buildings with domes
Landmarks in Hungary
1810s establishments in the Austrian Empire
19th-century establishments in Hungary
20th-century Roman Catholic church buildings in Hungary